Bethesda railway station was a station in Bethesda, Gwynedd, Wales.

History
The station was opened by the London and North Western Railway on 1 July 1884 as the terminal of the  Bethesda branch line.

The station was host to three LMS caravans from 1934 to 1936 followed by four caravans from 1937 to 1939.

The station closed to passengers on 3 December 1951 and closed completely on 7 October 1963.
Since closure the station has been demolished.

References

Further reading

External links

Disused railway stations in Gwynedd
Railway stations in Great Britain opened in 1884
Railway stations in Great Britain closed in 1963
Former London and North Western Railway stations